PPS commonly refers to:
 Post-postscript, an afterthought, usually in a document

PPS may also refer to:

Commerce and industry
 Pay per sale, a payment method used in affiliate marketing
 Premium Packaged Spirits or Pre-Packaged Spirits, a term for alcopops
 Project for Public Spaces, US nonprofit organization for creating and sustaining public places
 Purchasing power standard, an artificial currency unit
 Public Procurement Service, the South Korean national central procurement agency
 PPS, the IATA code for the Puerto Princesa International Airport in Palawan, Philippines
 Priority Passenger Service, a high level of Singapore Airlines' frequent flyer programme
 Price per share; see Equity

Computing
 Packets per second, a measure of throughput
 .pps, or PowerPoint Show, a file format used by the Microsoft PowerPoint presentation software
 PPS.tv, Chinese peer-to-peer streaming video network software
 Proofpoint Protection Server, a commercial product to detect and quarantine spam
 Pulse per second signal (related to greater accuracy in computer timing such as Network Time Protocol)

Education
 Paterson Public Schools district in Paterson, New Jersey
 Princeton Public Schools district in Princeton, New Jersey
 Pittsburgh Public Schools district in Pittsburgh, Pennsylvania
 Portland Public Schools (Oregon) district in Portland, Oregon
 Politics, Psychology and Sociology, an undergraduate degree course at the University of Cambridge

Entertainment
 Puyo Puyo Sun, a 1996 puzzle game

Political parties
 Pirate Party Switzerland
 ', the Polish Socialist Party
 Popular Socialist Party (Brazil)
 Popular Socialist Party (Mexico)
 Party of Progress and Socialism (Morocco)

Public administration
 Parliamentary Private Secretary, UK and New Zealand political post
 Parliamentary Protective Service, a Canadian law enforcement agency
 Partnership for Prosperity and Security in the Caribbean, an agreement between nations in the Caribbean region
 Personal Public Service Number, an identifier used in the Republic of Ireland
 Planning Policy Statements, under the UK's Planning and Compulsory Purchase Act 2004
 Prospective payment system, a health care payment model in the United States
 Public Prosecution Service (disambiguation), a body in some jurisdictions charged with the task of criminal prosecutions on behalf of the government.
 Provincial Police Service, a state civil service for police in Indian state of Uttar Pradesh

Science and technology
 Parkinson plus syndrome, a group of neurodegenerative diseases
 Pentosan polysulfate, a drug used to treat interstitial cystitis
 Poly(p-phenylene sulfide), a thermoplastic polymer
 PPS film capacitor, with a polyphenylene sulfide dielectric
 Popliteal pterygium syndrome, an inherited condition affecting the face, limbs, and genitalia
 Post-polio syndrome, a condition that affects some people who have previously survived an acute attack of poliomyelitis
 PPS Silent Surfactant, a cleavable detergent in biochemistry
 PPS submachine gun, a Soviet World War II-era submachine gun
 Precise Positioning Service, a military Global Positioning System feature
 Programmable power supply
 Puppy pregnancy syndrome, a delusional illness in humans
 Walther PPS, a compact semi-automatic pistol

See also

 
 PP (disambiguation)
 PS (disambiguation)